(Francis James) Ronald Bottrall OBE, (2 September 1906, Camborne, Cornwall – 25 June 1989) was a Cornish poet. He was praised highly by F.R. Leavis, Anthony Burgess and Martin Seymour-Smith, and deprecated by Ian Hamilton and Martin Amis.

Bottrall was educated at Redruth Grammar School and at Pembroke College, Cambridge.

Career 
 Lector in English, University of Helsingfors, Finland, 1929–31
 Commonwealth fund fellowship, Princeton University, USA, 1931–33 
 Johore Professor of English Language and Literature, Raffles College, Singapore, 1933–37
 Assistant Director, British Institute, Florence, Italy, 1937–38
 Secretary, SOAS, 1939–45
 Air Ministry: Temporary Administrative Officer, 1940; Priority Officer, 1941
 British Council Representative: in Sweden, 1941; in Italy, 1945; in Brazil, 1954; in Greece, 1957; in Japan (and Cultural Counsellor, HM Embassy, Tokyo), 1959
 Controller of Education, British Council, 1950–54
 Chief, Fellowships and Training Branch, Food and Agriculture Organization, 1963–65.

Honours and awards 
 OBE, 1949.
 Coronation Medal, 1953
 Syracuse International Poetry Prize, 1954
 Fellow of the Royal Society of Literature, 1955
 Knight of St. John, 1972
 Grande Ufficiale dell'Ordine al Merito della Repubblica Italiana, 1973
 Knight Commander, Order of St. John of Jerusalem, Malta, 1977

Personal life
He was the father of Anthony Bottrall, the diplomat, expert in developmental agriculture and politician.

Publications

Poetry
 The Loosening and other Poems, 1931
 Festivals of Fire, 1934
 The Turning Path, 1939
 Farewell and Welcome, 1945
 Selected Poems, 1946
 The Palisades of Fear, 1949
 Adam Unparadised, 1954
 Collected Poems, 1961
 Day and Night, 1974
 Poems 1955–73, 1974
 Reflections on the Nile, 1980
 Against a Setting Sun, 1983

Other 
 (with Gunnar Ekelöf) T.S. Eliot: Dikter i Urval, 1942
 (with Margaret Bottrall) The Zephyr Book of English Verse, 1945
 (with Margaret Bottrall) Collected English Verse, 1946
 Rome (Art Centres of the World), 1968.

References

1906 births
1989 deaths
Harkness Fellows
Officers of the Order of the British Empire
Alumni of Pembroke College, Cambridge
Fellows of the Royal Society of Literature
People educated at Redruth Grammar School
20th-century English poets
People from Camborne
Poets from Cornwall